Larutia miodactyla, the single finger larut skink or Titiwanga larut skink, is a species of skink. It is endemic to Peninsular Malaysia.

References

miodactyla
Reptiles of Malaysia
Endemic fauna of Malaysia
Reptiles described in 1903
Taxa named by George Albert Boulenger